The Ministry of Culture is the ministry of the Government of Italy in charge of national museums and the monuments historiques. MiC's headquarters are located in the historic Collegio Romano Palace (via del Collegio Romano 27, in central Rome) and the current Minister of Culture is Gennaro Sangiuliano.

History 
It was set up in 1974 as the Ministry for Cultural Assets and Environments by the Moro IV Cabinet through the decree read on 14 December 1974, n. 657, converted (with changes) from the law of 29 January 1975, n° 5. The new ministry (defined as  — that is for cultural assets, showing the wish to create a mainly technical organ) largely has the remit and functions previously under the Ministry of Public Education (specifically its Antiquity and Fine Arts, and Academies and Libraries, sections). To this remit and functions it some of those of the Ministry of the Interior (State archives) and of the President of the Council of Ministers (state computer archives, publishing and diffusion of culture).

 promotion of sports and sports arenas
 promotion of shows, in all their forms

In 2006, the sport portfolio was reassigned to the new .

The ministry is principally concerned with culture, the protection and preservation of artistic sites and property, landscape, and tourism (Decree 181/2006). At the end of 2006, the ministry's departments were abolished and their responsibilities returned to the ministry itself.

In 2009 the Ministry’s organisational structure underwent significant changes (Decree 91/2009): the coordination of ministerial functions is still entrusted to a Secretary General, the General Directorates have been reduced from nine to eight, with new denominations and a partial reshaping of their responsibilities. The eight General Directorates continue to be technically supported by high level scientific bodies (Central Institutes).

The peripheral ministerial structure of Ministry of Cultural Heritage and Activities is provided for, in 17 out of 20 regions, by Regional Directorates for Cultural Heritage and Landscape and by the local .

On 1 March 2021 the "Ministry of Cultural Heritage and Activities and Tourism" is renamed "Ministry of Culture".

Organisation

Central administration

The Ministry is made up of a variety of internal divisions, including:

 
 
 
 
 

Direzione generale Educazione, ricerca e istituti culturali;

  (General Directorates):
  - in charge of the landscape, fine arts, architectural and art heritage
  - in charge of national archives
  - in charge of national libraries and copyright
  - in charge of internal organisation
  - in charge of cinematography
  - in charge of art of XX and XXI century
  - in charge of education and cultural institutes
  - in charge of state museums
  - in charge of internal organisation
  - in charge of security of the cultural heritage
  - in charge of music, dance and theater

 (Central Institutes):
  - Central Institute of Restoration 
  - The  
 
 

ICR and OPD are global leader in the field of art restoration and provides teaching as Italian state conservation schools

Associated organs
  (Regional Directorates for Cultural Heritage and Landscape)
  (Superintendencies)
  (Superintendencies for Architectural Heritage and Landscape)
  (Superintendencies for Historical Patrimony, Artistic and Ethno-Anthropological Heritage)
  (Superintendencies for Archaeological Heritage) 
  (Archival Superintendencies)
  (National Archives)
  (National Libraries)
  (Museums)
  - Carabinieri Art Squad is the branch of the Italian Carabinieri responsible for combatting art and antiquities crimes

For more on the organization of the Ministry, see Ministry of Culture - Organization

Official names
 1974–1998:  (Ministry for Cultural Heritage and Environments)
 1998–2013:  (Ministry for Cultural Heritage and Activities)
 2013–2018:  (Ministry of Cultural Heritage and Activities and Tourism)
 2018-2019:  (Ministry for Cultural Heritage and Activities)
 2019-2021:  (Ministry of Cultural Heritage and Activities and Tourism)
 Since 2021:  (Ministry of Culture)

List of Ministers
The current Minister is Gennaro Sangiuliano, appointed on 22 October 2022 by Prime Minister Giorgia Meloni.

Logo 

The Ministry logo is inspired by the face of Apollo, in the famous sculptural group of Apollo and Daphne by Bernini kept at the Borghese Gallery.

References

External links
  Official site of the Ministero per i Beni e le Attività Culturali e per il Turismo
  Ministry of Cultural Heritage and Activities - Organisation
  Ministry of Cultural Heritage and Activities - Organisation (Decree 2009) - ASEF (Asian-Europe Foundation)

 
Government ministries of Italy
Culture ministers
1974 establishments in Italy
Rome R. IX Pigna
Italy, Cultural Heritage And Activities, Ministry